The West Bank is a landlocked territory east of Israel and west of Jordan, forming the bulk of the State of Palestine.

West Bank or Westbank may also refer to:

Administrative areas
 Judea and Samaria Area, the Israeli administrative district covering most of Area C of the West Bank
 , the site of many ancient Egyptian monuments, temples and tombs

Iraq
 West Bank of Mosul

Canada
 West Kelowna, a district municipality in British Columbia, nicknamed Westbank
 Westbank, British Columbia, a municipality in British Columbia, Canada
 Westbank First Nation, a First Nations government in Canada

United States
 Westbank, an area of the New Orleans metropolitan area; refers to the west side of the Mississippi River
 Westbank Expressway, a portion of U.S. Route 90 Business in this area
 West Bank, an area of the University of Minnesota
West Bank station, a light rail station serving the West Bank campus
 Cedar-Riverside, referred to as West Bank, an area of Minneapolis

Europe
 West Bank (Rhine), the western side of the river Rhine, a region claimed either by France or Germany in the modern era
 West Bank, an area of Widnes, Cheshire, England
 West Bank House, a boarding house in Uppingham School in Rutland, England

Other uses
 West Bank, a clone of the arcade game Bank Panic

See also
 Bank West (disambiguation)
 Vereins- und Westbank, a Bavarian bank
 Westbank hospital, India
 Westbank Orphanage, a former orphanage in Ireland
 Western bank (disambiguation)